Marad Beach is a small fishing village near Kallayi in Kozhikode city in India. The beach is located behind Kallayi railway station.

The Marad Road starts from Kallayi town and passes through Chakkum Kadavu village and Payyanakkal village.  Marad and Kayyadithode villages are adjacent to each other.

History 
In 2003, eight Hindus and one Muslim were killed in a religiously-motivated incident. In 2009, a special court sentenced 62 people for life imprisonment.

Economy
Fishing is the major  economic activity here.

Landmarks 
 The Panniyankara ROB, A Road Overbridge is being constructed at Panniyankara on the national highway.  Once this ROB is completed, Marad will start tasting the fruits of development.  
 Gotheeshwaram temple

See also

 Chalappuram
 Kallayi
 Kozhikode beach
 Beypore
 Nallalam

References

Suburbs of Kozhikode
Kozhikode beach